In organic chemistry, peptide synthesis is the production of peptides, compounds where multiple amino acids are linked via amide bonds, also known as peptide bonds. Peptides are chemically synthesized by the condensation reaction of the carboxyl group of one amino acid to the amino group of another. Protecting group strategies are usually necessary to prevent undesirable side reactions with the various amino acid side chains. Chemical peptide synthesis most commonly starts at the carboxyl end of the peptide (C-terminus), and proceeds toward the amino-terminus (N-terminus). Protein biosynthesis (long peptides) in living organisms occurs in the opposite direction.

The chemical synthesis of peptides can be carried out using classical solution-phase techniques, although these have been replaced in most research and development settings by solid-phase methods (see below). Solution-phase synthesis retains its usefulness in large-scale production of peptides for industrial purposes however.

Chemical synthesis facilitates the production of peptides that are difficult to express in bacteria, the incorporation of unnatural amino acids, peptide/protein backbone modification, and the synthesis of D-proteins, which consist of D-amino acids.

Solid-phase synthesis

The established method for the production of synthetic peptides in the lab is known as solid phase peptide synthesis (SPPS). Pioneered by Robert Bruce Merrifield, SPPS allows the rapid assembly of a peptide chain through successive reactions of amino acid derivatives on a macroscopically insoluble solvent-swollen beaded resin support.

The solid support consists of small, polymeric resin beads functionalized with reactive groups (such as amine or hydroxyl groups) that link to the nascent peptide chain. Since the peptide remains covalently attached to the support throughout the synthesis, excess reagents and side products can be removed by washing and filtration. This approach circumvents the comparatively time-consuming isolation of the product peptide from solution after each reaction step, which would be required when using conventional solution-phase synthesis.

Each amino acid to be coupled to the peptide chain N-terminus must be protected on its N-terminus and side chain using appropriate protecting groups such as Boc (acid-labile) or Fmoc (base-labile), depending on the side chain and the protection strategy used (see below).

The general SPPS procedure is one of repeated cycles of alternate N-terminal deprotection and coupling reactions. The resin can be washed between each steps. First an amino acid is coupled to the resin. Subsequently, the amine is deprotected, and then coupled with the activated carboxyl group of the next amino acid to be added. This cycle is repeated until the desired sequence has been synthesized. SPPS cycles may also include capping steps which block the ends of unreacted amino acids from reacting. At the end of the synthesis, the crude peptide is cleaved from the solid support while simultaneously removing all protecting groups using a reagent such as trifluoroacetic acid. The crude peptide can be precipitated from a non-polar solvent like diethyl ether in order to remove organic soluble byproducts. The crude peptide can be purified using reversed-phase HPLC. The purification process, especially of longer peptides can be challenging, because cumulative amounts of numerous minor byproducts, which have properties similar to the desired peptide product, have to be removed. For this reason so-called continuous chromatography processes such as MCSGP are increasingly being used in commercial settings to maximize the yield without sacrificing purity.

SPPS is limited by reaction yields, and typically peptides and proteins in the range of 70 amino acids are pushing the limits of synthetic accessibility. Synthetic difficulty also is sequence dependent; typically aggregation-prone sequences such as amyloids are difficult to make. Longer lengths can be accessed by using ligation approaches such as native chemical ligation, where two shorter fully deprotected synthetic peptides can be joined in solution.

Peptide coupling reagents

An important feature that has enabled the broad application of SPPS is the generation of extremely high yields in the coupling step. Highly efficient amide bond-formation conditions are required. and adding an excess of each amino acid (between 2- and 10-fold). The minimization of amino acid racemization during coupling is also of vital importance to avoid epimerization in the final peptide product.

Amide bond formation between an amine and carboxylic acid is slow, and as such usually requires  'coupling reagents' or 'activators'. A wide range of coupling reagents exist, due in part to their varying effectiveness for particular couplings, many of these reagents are commercially available.

Carbodiimides

Carbodiimides such as dicyclohexylcarbodiimide (DCC) and diisopropylcarbodiimide (DIC) are frequently used for amide bond formation. The reaction proceeds via the formation of a highly reactive O-acylisourea. This reactive intermediate is attacked by the peptide N-terminal amine, forming a peptide bond. Formation of the O-acylisourea proceeds fastest in non-polar solvents such as dichloromethane.

DIC is particularly useful for SPPS since as a liquid it is easily dispensed, and the urea byproduct is easily washed away. Conversely, the related carbodiimide 1-Ethyl-3-(3-dimethylaminopropyl)carbodiimide (EDC) is often used for solution-phase peptide couplings as its urea byproduct can be removed by washing during aqueous work-up.

Carbodiimide activation opens the possibility for racemization of the activated amino acid. Racemization can be circumvented with 'racemization suppressing' additives such as the triazoles 1-hydroxy-benzotriazole (HOBt), and 1-hydroxy-7-aza-benzotriazole (HOAt). These reagents attack the O-acylisourea intermediate to form an active ester, which subsequently reacts with the peptide to form the desired peptide bond. Ethyl cyanohydroxyiminoacetate (Oxyma), an additive for carbodiimide coupling, acts as an alternative to HOAt.

Aminium/uronium and phosphonium salts

Some coupling reagents omit the carbodiimide completely and incorporate the HOAt/HOBt moiety as an aminium/uronium or phosphonium salt of a non-nucleophilic anion (tetrafluoroborate or hexafluorophosphate). Examples of aminium/uronium reagents include HATU (HOAt), HBTU/TBTU (HOBt) and HCTU (6-ClHOBt). HBTU and TBTU differ only in the choice of anion. Phosphonium reagents include PyBOP (HOBt) and PyAOP (HOAt).

These reagents form the same active ester species as the carbodiimide activation conditions, but differ in the rate of the initial activation step, which is determined by nature of the carbon skeleton of the coupling reagent. Furthermore, aminium/uronium reagents are capable of reacting with the peptide N-terminus to form an inactive guanidino by-product, whereas phosphonium reagents are not.

Propanephosphonic acid anhydride 
Since late 2000s, propanephosphonic acid anhydride, sold commercially under various names such as "T3P", has become a useful reagent for amide bond formation in commercial applications. It converts the oxygen of the carboxylic acid into a leaving group, whose peptide-coupling byproducts are water-soluble and can be easily washed away. In a performance comparison between propanephosphonic acid anhydride and other peptide coupling reagents for the preparation of a nonapeptide drug, it was found that this reagent was superior to other reagents with regards to yield and low epimerization.

Solid supports

Solid supports for peptide synthesis are selected for physical stability, to permit the rapid filtration of liquids.  Suitable supports are inert to reagents and solvents used during SPPS and allow for the attachment of the first amino acid. Swelling is of great importance because peptide synthesis takes place inside the swollen pores of the solid support.

Three primary types of solid supports are: gel-type supports, surface-type supports, and composites. Improvements to solid supports used for peptide synthesis enhance their ability to withstand the repeated use of TFA during the deprotection step of SPPS. Two primary resins are used, based on whether a C-terminal carboxylic acid or amide is desired. The Wang resin was, the most commonly used resin for peptides with C-terminal carboxylic acids.

Protecting groups schemes

As described above, the use of N-terminal and side chain protecting groups is essential during peptide synthesis to avoid undesirable side reactions, such as self-coupling of the activated amino acid leading to (polymerization). This would compete with the intended peptide coupling reaction, resulting in low yield or even complete failure to synthesize the desired peptide.

Two principal protecting group schemes are typically used in solid phase peptide synthesis: so-called Boc/benzyl and Fmoc/tert.butyl approaches. The Boc/Bzl strategy utilizes TFA-labile N-terminal Boc protection alongside side chain protection that is removed using anhydrous hydrogen fluoride during the final cleavage step (with simultaneous cleavage of the peptide from the solid support). Fmoc/tBu SPPS uses base-labile Fmoc N-terminal protection, with side chain protection and a resin linkage that are acid-labile (final acidic cleavage is carried out via TFA treatment).

Both approaches, including the advantages and disadvantages of each, are outlined in more detail below.

Boc/Bzl SPPS

Before the advent of SPPS, solution methods for chemical peptide synthesis relied on tert-butyloxycarbonyl (abbreviated 'Boc') as a temporary N-terminal α-amino protecting group. The Boc group is removed with acid, such as trifluoroacetic acid (TFA). This forms a positively charged amino group in the presence of excess TFA (note that the amino group is not protonated in the image on the right), which is neutralized and coupled to the incoming activated amino acid. Neutralization can either occur prior to coupling or in situ during the basic coupling reaction.

The Boc/Bzl approach retains its usefulness in reducing peptide aggregation during synthesis. In addition, Boc/benzyl SPPS may be preferred over the Fmoc/tert.butyl approach when synthesizing peptides containing base-sensitive moieties (such as depsipeptides or thioester moeities), as treatment with base is required during the Fmoc deprotection step (see below).

Permanent side-chain protecting groups used during Boc/benzyl SPPS are typically benzyl or benzyl-based groups. Final removal of the peptide from the solid support occurs simultaneously with side chain deprotection using anhydrous hydrogen fluoride via hydrolytic cleavage. The final product is a fluoride salt which is relatively easy to solubilize. Scavengers such as cresol must be added to the HF in order to prevent reactive cations from generating undesired byproducts.

Fmoc/tBu SPPS

The use of N-terminal Fmoc protection allows for a milder deprotection scheme than used for Boc/Bzl SPPS, and this protection scheme is truly orthogonal under SPPS conditions. Fmoc deprotection utilizes a base, typically 20–50% piperidine in DMF. The exposed amine is therefore neutral, and consequently no neutralization of the peptide-resin is required, as in the case of the Boc/Bzl approach. The lack of electrostatic repulsion between the peptide chains can lead to increased risk of aggregation with Fmoc/tBu SPPS however. Because the liberated fluorenyl group is a chromophore, Fmoc deprotection can be monitored by UV absorbance of the reaction mixture, a strategy which is employed in automated peptide synthesizers.

The ability of the Fmoc group to be cleaved under relatively mild basic conditions while being stable to acid allows the use of side chain protecting groups such as Boc and tBu that can be removed in milder acidic final cleavage conditions (TFA) than those used for final cleavage in Boc/Bzl SPPS (HF). Scavengers such as water and triisopropylsilane (TIPS) are most commonly added during the final cleavage in order to prevent side reactions with reactive cationic species released as a result of side chain deprotection. Nevertheless, many other scavenger compounds could be used as well. The resulting crude peptide is obtained as a TFA salt, which is potentially more difficult to solubilize than the fluoride salts generated in Boc SPPS.

Fmoc/tBu SPPS is less atom-economical, as the fluorenyl group is much larger than the Boc group. Accordingly, prices for Fmoc amino acids were high until the large-scale piloting of one of the first synthesized peptide drugs, enfuvirtide, began in the 1990s, when market demand adjusted the relative prices of Fmoc- vs Boc- amino acids.

Other protecting groups

Benzyloxy-carbonyl

The (Z) group is another carbamate-type amine protecting group, discovered by Leonidas Zervas in the early 1930s and usually added via reaction with benzyl chloroformate.

It is removed under harsh conditions using HBr in acetic acid, or milder conditions of catalytic hydrogenation.

This methodology was first used in the synthesis of oligopeptides by Zervas and Max Bergmann in 1932. Hence, this became known as the Bergmann-Zervas synthesis, which was characterised "epoch-making" and helped establish synthetic peptide chemistry as a distinct field. It constituted the first useful lab method for controlled peptide synthesis, enabling the synthesis of previously unattainable peptides with reactive side-chains, while Z-protected amino acids are also prevented form undergoing racemization.

The use of the Bergmann-Zervas method remained the standard practice in peptide chemistry for two full decades after its publication, superseded by newer methods (such as the Boc protecting group) in the early 1950s. Nowadays, while it has been used periodically for α-amine protection, it is much more commonly used for side chain protection.

Alloc and miscellaneous groups
The allyloxycarbonyl (alloc) protecting group is sometimes used to protect an amino group (or carboxylic acid or alcohol group) when an orthogonal deprotection scheme is required. It is also sometimes used when conducting on-resin cyclic peptide formation, where the peptide is linked to the resin by a side-chain functional group. The Alloc group can be removed using tetrakis(triphenylphosphine)palladium(0).

For special applications like synthetic steps involving protein microarrays, protecting groups sometimes termed "lithographic" are used, which are amenable to photochemistry at a particular wavelength of light, and so which can be removed during lithographic types of operations.

Regioselective disulfide bond formation
The formation of multiple native disulfides remains challenging of native peptide synthesis by solid-phase methods. Random chain combination typically results in several products with nonnative disulfide bonds. Stepwise formation of disulfide bonds is typically the preferred method, and performed with thiol protecting groups. Different thiol protecting groups provide multiple dimensions of orthogonal protection. These orthogonally protected cysteines are incorporated during the solid-phase synthesis of the peptide. Successive removal of these groups, to allow for selective exposure of free thiol groups, leads to disulfide formation in a stepwise manner. The order of removal of the groups must be considered so that only one group is removed at a time.

Thiol protecting groups used in peptide synthesis requiring later regioselective disulfide bond formation must possess multiple characteristics. First, they must be reversible with conditions that do not affect the unprotected side chains. Second, the protecting group must be able to withstand the conditions of solid-phase synthesis. Third, the removal of the thiol protecting group must be such that it leaves intact other thiol protecting groups, if orthogonal protection is desired. That is, the removal of PG A should not affect PG B. Some of the thiol protecting groups commonly used include the acetamidomethyl (Acm), tert-butyl (But), 3-nitro-2-pyridine sulfenyl (NPYS), 2-pyridine-sulfenyl (Pyr), and trityl (Trt) groups. Importantly, the NPYS group can replace the Acm PG to yield an activated thiol.

Using this method, Kiso and coworkers reported the first total synthesis of insulin in 1993. In this work, the A-chain of insulin was prepared with following protecting groups in place on its cysteines: CysA6(But), CysA7(Acm), and CysA11(But), leaving CysA20 unprotected.

Microwave-assisted peptide synthesis

Microwave-assisted peptide synthesis has been used to complete long peptide sequences with high degrees of yield and low degrees of racemization.

Synthesizing long peptides
Stepwise elongation, in which the amino acids are connected step-by-step in turn, is ideal for small peptides containing between 2 and 100 amino acid residues. Another method is fragment condensation, in which peptide fragments are coupled. Although the former can elongate the peptide chain without racemization, the yield drops if only it is used in the creation of long or highly polar peptides. Fragment condensation is better than stepwise elongation for synthesizing sophisticated long peptides, but its use must be restricted in order to protect against racemization. Fragment condensation is also undesirable since the coupled fragment must be in gross excess, which may be a limitation depending on the length of the fragment.

A new development for producing longer peptide chains is chemical ligation: unprotected peptide chains react chemoselectively in aqueous solution. A first kinetically controlled product rearranges to form the amide bond. The most common form of native chemical ligation uses a peptide thioester that reacts with a terminal cysteine residue.

Other methods applicable for covalently linking polypeptides in aqueous solution include the use of split inteins, spontaneous isopeptide bond formation and sortase ligation.

In order to optimize synthesis of long peptides, a method was developed in Medicon Valley for converting peptide sequences.  The simple pre-sequence (e.g. Lysine (Lysn); Glutamic Acid (Glun); (LysGlu)n) that is incorporated at the C-terminus of the peptide to induce an alpha-helix-like structure. This can potentially increase biological half-life, improve peptide stability and inhibit enzymatic degradation without altering pharmacological activity or profile of action.

Cyclic peptides

On resin cyclization
Peptides can be cyclized on a solid support. A variety of cyclization reagents can be used such as HBTU/HOBt/DIEA, PyBop/DIEA, PyClock/DIEA. Head-to-tail peptides can be made on the solid support. The deprotection of the C-terminus at some suitable point allows on-resin cyclization by amide bond formation with the deprotected N-terminus. Once cyclization has taken place, the peptide is cleaved from resin by acidolysis and purified.

The strategy for the solid-phase synthesis of cyclic peptides is not limited to attachment through Asp, Glu or Lys side chains. Cysteine has a very reactive sulfhydryl group on its side chain. A disulfide bridge is created when a sulfur atom from one Cysteine forms a single covalent bond with another sulfur atom from a second cysteine in a different part of the protein. These bridges help to stabilize proteins, especially those secreted from cells. Some researchers use modified cysteines using S-acetomidomethyl (Acm) to block the formation of the disulfide bond but preserve the cysteine and the protein's original primary structure.

Off-resin cyclization
Off-resin cyclization is a solid-phase synthesis of key intermediates, followed by the key cyclization in solution phase, the final deprotection of any masked side chains is also carried out in solution phase.  This has the disadvantages that the efficiencies of solid-phase synthesis are lost in the solution phase steps, that purification from by-products, reagents and unconverted material is required, and that undesired oligomers can be formed if macrocycle formation is involved.

The use of pentafluorophenyl esters (FDPP, PFPOH) and BOP-Cl are useful for cyclising peptides.

See also 
Oligonucleotide synthesis
Clicked peptide polymer
Bailey peptide synthesis

References

Further reading

External links 

Chemical synthesis
Peptides
Peptide coupling reagents
Biochemistry methods
Biochemistry
Amide synthesis reactions